This is a list of seasons completed by the Florida Atlantic Owls football team. Representing Florida Atlantic University, the Owls compete in Conference USA in the NCAA Division I. They have played their home games out of FAU Stadium since 2011. Florida Atlantic is currently led by head coach Tom Herman.

Florida Atlantic began playing football in 2001, initially competing as a Division I-AA (now FCS) independent for three years before joining the rankings of Division I-A (now FBS) as an independent in 2004. While in Division I-AA, the Owls made the playoffs in 2003, advancing to the semifinals before falling to Colgate. In 2005, FAU joined the ranks of the Sun Belt Conference, where they would remain for eight seasons before leaving for Conference USA where they currently compete. The Owls were co-champions of the Sun Belt in 2007, and played in the school's first-ever bowl game, a 44–27 win in the 2007 New Orleans Bowl against Memphis. The following season, FAU qualified for a bowl game again and won the 2008 Motor City Bowl over Central Michigan.

Seasons

References

Florida Atlantic Owls

Florida Atlantic Owls football seasons